George Petrakos (born c. 1988 in Essex, England) is a rugby union strength and conditioning coach with Glasgow Warriors.

Rugby Union

Coaching career

He started as a Strength and Conditioning Coach for Glasgow Warriors in 2016.

He previously worked with Leicester Tigers, Edinburgh rugby and Scotland.

Football

He was a Sports Science intern with Chelsea FC. During a year at the football club he worked under Scolari, Hiddink and Ancelotti.

Hockey

Petrakos was the Lead Strength and Conditioning Coach for the Ireland national women's hockey team.

Academic career

Petrakos graduated from the University of Loughborough with a BSc in Sports Science.

He then studied at the University of Edinburgh and gained a Masters in Strength and Conditioning.

In Ireland he became the Lead Strength and Conditioning Coach for University College Dublin and lectured in the subject from 2012 - 16.

He became a researcher in force application at the Dublin University and used resisted sled sprint training to profile sprinting performance from 2015 - 16. He has published research on using very heavy sled training for improving horizontal force output.

References

External links
Glasgow Warriors club staff
Glasgow Warriors and Paralympian Sammi Kinghorn share training techniques

Living people
1988 births
Glasgow Warriors coaches
Rugby union strength and conditioning coaches